("Did You Know?") is a Brazilian YouTube channel focusing on entertainment and curiosities created on September 1, 2013, hosted by Lukas Marques and Daniel Mologni. Você Sabia? features edutainment videos such as videos of theories, mysteries, trivia, and other topics. The creators also maintain a secondary channel called Você Sabia GAMES.

In the past, the channel had numerous features, such as "VS10", "Você Sabia Porque" ("Did you know why?"), "VSNews", and others. However, the channel currently has only two regular series, "VSResponde" and "Você Sabia? Retrô".

In 2017, the project gave rise to the book Você Sabia? + de 400 Coisas Que Você Deveria Saber ("Did You Know? 400+ Things You Should Know").

Although educational, the channel has been the subject of several controversies and criticisms, due to the fact that some of its old videos are not considered politically correct.

As of October 31, 2022, the channel was the 54th most-subscribed YouTube channel in the world with 43.8 million subscribers.

Second channel 
On April 10, 2014, YouTubers Lukas Marques and Daniel Mologni created a secondary channel called "Você Sabe PLUS" (later renamed "Você Sabe GAMES"), to focus on game curiosities, but the channel ended up bringing together various subjects, such as videos from daily life vlogs, gameplays, and other themes. Most of the videos are focused on curiosities and facts related to the gamer world. The channel is updated less frequently than the main channel.

History
In the beginning, Lukas Marques and Daniel Mologni had a blog together, called "Calma, Cara", which gathered daily news. After high school Daniel Mologni and Lukas Marques moved, getting back together again after two years at a YouPIX event. In the beginning, videos were recorded remotely and combined during editing. With the growth of the channel, the duo moved to São Paulo where the production began to become professionalized.

On December 31, 2020, Lukas Marques and Daniel Mologni posted the video "THANK YOU SO MUCH FOR 2020 and a GREAT 2021 TO ALL!! ", where it was announced they would take a break from YouTube and repost the old videos from the channel under the new title, "Você Sabia? Retrô". The first video of the series was posted on 12 January 2021.

Controversies 
In 2017, the newspaper Folha de S.Paulo published an article explaining that the channel Você Sabia? had received 65 thousand reais from the Ministry of Education to publicize the proposal for the New High School, and also highlighted that the channel hadn't said it would be advertising content. Later, Folha published another article highlighting that YouTuber Lukas Marques had posted offensive and prejudiced posts against blacks, women, and gays on his Twitter account in 2014. Due to strong controversy, the channel lost many subscribers and YouTubers suspended the posting of videos from the channel.

Awards

References

Official Channel 
 Você Sabia?

Official website not in Wikidata
YouTube channels
YouTube channels launched in 2013